Buffalo Gap is an incorporated town in Taylor County, Texas, United States. It is part of the Abilene, Texas Metropolitan Statistical Area. The population was 464 at the 2010 census. It is the former county seat of Taylor County, having been supplanted in 1883 by the much larger Abilene to its north. Abilene won the referendum to be the county seat by a vote of 905–269.

Buffalo Gap is the home of the large Buffalo Gap Historic Village, open year-round to visitors.

History
The town noted in the 1960s and 1970s for its restaurants and the fact that it was one of two "wet" spots in Taylor County where alcoholic beverages could be sold. Deutschlander Freshwater Catfish Company and the Bar B Q Barn still operate today.

The Shades of Hope Treatment Center in Buffalo Gap specializes in the treatment of eating disorders, and has been featured on The Oprah Winfrey Show.

Geography

Buffalo Gap is located at  (32.281044, –99.829265).

According to the United States Census Bureau, the town has a total area of 2.3 square miles (6.0 km2), all of it land.

Demographics

2020 census

As of the 2020 United States census, there were 543 people, 222 households, and 158 families residing in the town.

2000 census
As of the census of 2000, there were 463 people, 194 households, and 140 families residing in the town. The population density was 201.7 people per square mile (77.7/km2). There were 235 housing units at an average density of 102.4 per square mile (39.4/km2). The racial makeup of the town was 96.76% White, 0.22% African American, 0.22% Native American, 0.22% Asian, 0.65% from other races, and 1.94% from two or more races. Hispanic or Latino of any race were 3.24% of the population.

There were 194 households, out of which 29.4% had children under the age of 18 living with them, 53.6% were married couples living together, 16.0% had a female householder with no husband present, and 27.8% were non-families. 26.3% of all households were made up of individuals, and 10.8% had someone living alone who was 65 years of age or older. The average household size was 2.31 and the average family size was 2.77.

In the town, the population was spread out, with 23.8% under the age of 18, 6.3% from 18 to 24, 23.1% from 25 to 44, 30.5% from 45 to 64, and 16.4% who were 65 years of age or older. The median age was 43 years. For every 100 females, there were 80.2 males. For every 100 females age 18 and over, there were 76.5 males.

The median income for a household in the town was $31,875, and the median income for a family was $34,886. Males had a median income of $26,875 versus $20,500 for females. The per capita income for the town was $14,680. About 6.6% of families and 12.6% of the population were below the poverty line, including 16.5% of those under age 18 and 12.3% of those age 65 or above.

Education
The towns of Tuscola, Lawn, and Buffalo Gap are served by the Jim Ned Consolidated Independent School District based in Tuscola.

Sports
Buffalo Gap is the hometown of University of Texas quarterback Colt McCoy. McCoy lived on a ten-acre spread in Buffalo Gap during his years as the quarterback for Jim Ned High School. His high school coach was his father, Brad McCoy.

During various Super Bowl games of the 1990s, Buffalo Gap experienced "official" name changes, including sign modifications, to show support for the regional Dallas Cowboys. The similarly named city of Buffalo in Leon County in East Texas did likewise.

Notable people

 Oliver Lee, marshal, rancher, and gunman. Namesake to Oliver Lee Memorial State Park
 Rawghlie Clement Stanford, governor of Arizona from 1937 to 1939
 Aaron Watson, independent country artist. First artist to have a #1 album in country music without a major record label

External links
 Buffalo Gap tourist information
 Buffalo Gap Historic Village information
 Buffalo Gap Historic Village information

References

Towns in Taylor County, Texas
Towns in Texas
Abilene metropolitan area
Former county seats in Texas